The Katharine Hepburn Cultural Arts Center, known as The Kate, is a performing arts center in Old Saybrook, Connecticut that opened in 2009. It is named for Katharine Hepburn, the 4-time Academy Award winning actress and Old Saybrook's most celebrated resident.

The Kate is a non-profit performing arts organization located in a historic theater/town hall on Main Street in Old Saybrook. Originally opened in 1911 and listed on the National Register of Historic Places, the Center has been renovated with public funds from the Town of Old Saybrook and donations raised by the Trustees of the Kate. It includes a 285-seat theater and the Katharine Hepburn Museum. As befits an organization born of such a public/private partnership, programming is eclectic, offering something for all ages and attracts patrons from throughout Connecticut and the region. The Kate presents more than 250 performances and events each year, including music, theater, comedy, film, simulcasts of the Metropolitan Opera, and dance, as well as host arts education programs for children and youth.

The Katharine Hepburn Museum presents an authentic view of the cultural and historical impact of Miss Hepburn and her family. In addition to many photographs from Katharine Hepburn’s life and career, the exhibit features her 1975 Primetime Emmy Award, examples of letters written to her family during the early years of her career, costume and personal wardrobe pieces, and two of her paintings, including a self-portrait. The Kate frequently entertains offers for donations to add to the collection.

The building in which the venue is housed dates from circa 1910 and was listed on the National Register of Historic Places in 2007 as Old Saybrook Town Hall and Theater.  The property is also known as The Katharine Hepburn Cultural Arts Center and Theater.

The 285-seat theater had the blessing of the Hepburn Estate and the actress's family. Cynthia McFadden of ABC News, an executor of the Hepburn Estate, was an honorary capital campaign committee member. Hepburn's brother-in-law, Ellsworth Grant, was instrumental in helping the Board of Trustees honor the actress with his knowledge of Hepburn and her family. Grant was an author and former Mayor of West Hartford, Connecticut.

Former Connecticut Governor M. Jodi Rell said the following about the Katharine Hepburn Cultural Arts Center:
"It is my pleasure to recognize that one of Connecticut's own is being honored in the naming of an historic building that will perpetuate her legacy. Katharine Hepburn contributed much in her long career in film and theater, not only to Connecticut, but throughout the world. To remember her in this manner is most fitting and I salute the efforts of all those involved."

Connecticut U.S. Senator Christopher Dodd had also recognized the theater in saying:
"I commend everyone participating in this grand effort to restore the old Town Hall building in Old Saybrook to create in its place the Katharine Hepburn Cultural Arts Center, I'm honored that I can lend my name in support of what will be a meaningful and inspiring tribute to our Connecticut treasure, Katharine Hepburn."

The building was designed by New London architect James Sweeney, and "is a fine example of the Colonial Revival Style."  The general contractor was William L. Roe Jr., also of New London.

See also 
National Register of Historic Places listings in Middlesex County, Connecticut

References

External links
Official web site & blog

Colonial Revival architecture in Connecticut
Theatres in Connecticut
Old Saybrook, Connecticut
Buildings and structures in Middlesex County, Connecticut
Tourist attractions in Middlesex County, Connecticut
Katharine Hepburn
National Register of Historic Places in Middlesex County, Connecticut
Theatres on the National Register of Historic Places in Connecticut
City and town halls on the National Register of Historic Places in Connecticut